Javier "Javi" Fuego Martínez (born 4 January 1984) is a Spanish former professional footballer who played as a defensive midfielder.

He played 277 La Liga matches over ten seasons, scoring a total of nine goals for Levante, Recreativo, Rayo Vallecano, Valencia, Espanyol and Villarreal. He added 256 appearances in Segunda División, mainly in representation of Sporting de Gijón.

Club career

Early years and Recreativo
Fuego was born in Pola de Siero, Asturias. He started playing professional football for Sporting de Gijón, representing the local side in six Segunda División seasons and being first choice from 2004 to 2007.

In the 2007–08 campaign, Fuego signed with La Liga strugglers Levante UD, but was one of many players to leave the squad upon relegation and serious financial problems. In August 2008, he signed a three-year deal worth €140.000 with Andalusia's Recreativo de Huelva, appearing regularly as a starter but being relegated from the top flight in his first year.

Rayo Vallecano
For 2010–11, Fuego joined Rayo Vallecano, quickly establishing himself as first choice for the Madrid club and helping it to a second-place finish and subsequent top-division promotion. 

He rarely missed a match in his subsequent two-year spell in that tier, helping his team consecutively retain their status.

Valencia
In January 2013, months before the season was over, it was announced that Fuego would not renew his expiring contract with Rayo, agreeing to a three-year deal with fellow league club Valencia CF as of 1 July. He made his official debut on 17 August, playing the full 90 minutes in a 1–0 home win against Málaga CF.

Fuego scored the first brace of his professional career on 23 March 2014, netting both of his team's goals in a 2–1 victory over Villarreal CF also at the Mestalla Stadium. On 1 April 2015, he renewed his link until 30 June 2017 with the option of a further season.

Fuego played seven games in the 2015–16 UEFA Champions League in a group-stage exit, the first being a 3–1 home defeat of AS Monaco FC in the play-off round where he came on as a second-half substitute for Paco Alcácer.

Espanyol
On 13 August 2016, Fuego signed a three-year contract with RCD Espanyol. He started in 29 of his 31 league appearances in his first season, scoring once in an eventual eighth-place finish.

Villarreal
On 30 January 2018, aged 34, Fuego joined Villarreal on a two-and-a-half-year deal. He featured rarely during his spell in the Valencian Community, due to injuries and a bacterial infection.

Return to Sporting
Fuego returned to first club Sporting on 26 June 2019, after agreeing to a two-year contract. He announced his retirement on 23 July 2021.

Honours
Spain U23
Mediterranean Games: 2005

References

External links

1984 births
Living people
People from Siero
Spanish footballers
Footballers from Asturias
Association football midfielders
La Liga players
Segunda División players
Tercera División players
Sporting de Gijón B players
Sporting de Gijón players
Levante UD footballers
Recreativo de Huelva players
Rayo Vallecano players
Valencia CF players
RCD Espanyol footballers
Villarreal CF players
Spain youth international footballers
Spain under-21 international footballers
Spain under-23 international footballers
Competitors at the 2005 Mediterranean Games
Mediterranean Games medalists in football
Mediterranean Games gold medalists for Spain